Víctor Aguirre Alcaide (born 28 July 1972) is a Mexican politician affiliated with the Party of the Democratic Revolution (PRD). As of 2014 he served as Deputy of the LX Legislature of the Mexican Congress representing Guerrero.

References

1972 births
Living people
Politicians from Guerrero
Party of the Democratic Revolution politicians
21st-century Mexican politicians
People from Acapulco
Autonomous University of Guerrero alumni
Deputies of the LX Legislature of Mexico
Members of the Chamber of Deputies (Mexico) for Guerrero